Tavel is a commune in the Gard department in southern France.

Population

See also
 Communes of the Gard department
 Tavel AOC

References

Communes of Gard